The 4th Annual Interactive Achievement Awards is the 4th edition of the Interactive Achievement Awards, an annual awards event that honors the best games in the video game industry. It was hosted by Martin Lewis, and featured presenters included Scott Campbell, Louis Castle, Tony Goodman, Lorne Lanning, Sid Meier, Ray Muzyka, Gabe Newell, Chris Taylor, Will Wright, and Greg Zeschuk.

Diablo II won Game of the Year. Jet Grind Radio received the most nominations, but did not win a single award. The PlayStation 2 launch title SSX ended up winning the most awards. Electronic Arts received the most nominations and won the most awards. Some of which were for publishing SquareSoft games outside of Japan. There was also a tie between FIFA 2001 and Motocross Madness 2 for PC Sports Game of the Year.

John Carmack was also the received the of the Academy of Interactive Arts & Sciences Hall of Fame Award.

Winners and Nominees
Winners are listed first, highlighted in boldface, and indicated with a double dagger.

Hall of Fame Award
 John Carmack

Games with multiple nominations and awards

The following 32 games received multiple nominations:

The following seven games received multiple awards:

Companies with multiple nominations

Companies that received multiple nominations as either a developer or a publisher.

Companies that received multiple awards as either a developer or a publisher.

Notes

External links
 Archived Winners/Finalists Page

References

Annual Interactive Achievement Awards
Annual Interactive Achievement Awards
Annual Interactive Achievement Awards
Annual Interactive Achievement Awards
Annual Interactive Achievement Awards
D.I.C.E. Award ceremonies